Chelsie Dawber (born 12 January 2000) is an Australian professional women's football player. She plays for Norrköping in the Damallsvenskan on loan from Chicago Red Stars in the National Women's Soccer League. Adelaide United’s all time leading goal scorer.

Club career
In 2016, Dawber suffered a serious head injury while playing indoor soccer. This injury kept her out of the game for one year.

Adelaide United 
In 2017, Dawber joined her first club, Adelaide United in the W-League. She made her debut on 3 November 2017 in a 2–1 loss against Western Sydney Wanderers coming on as a substitute for Emily Condon.

In the 2021/22 season, Dawber had a breakout year for the Reds, scoring 10 goals. This helped place Adelaide into their first ever finals campaign.

Dawber finished sixth in the A-League Women's Julie Dolan Medal, an award given to the best performer throughout the season. She finished on 13 votes, with teammate Fiona Worts collecting the award.

Adelaide City 
In 2020, Dawber scored a record 31 goals in 11 games for Adelaide City in the Women's National Premier League. Her team would go on to win the cup that season, but lose 2–1 to Metro United in the grand final.

In 2021, Dawber won the Women's National Premier League most prestigious award, the Shirley Brown Medal with 23 votes.

Chicago Red Stars 
On 6 April 2022, it was announced Dawber had signed for Chicago Red Stars.
In November 2022, Dawber returned to Adelaide United on loan for the 2022–23 A-League Women season. In March 2023, Dawber was recalled early from her loan to be loaned to Swedish club Norrköping for the 2023 Damallsvenskan season.

International career

Australia U17
In 2014, Dawber was selected to represent Australia with the Mini Matildas

Australia U23
In July 2022, Dawber was selected to join the Australian U23 team in the Philippines for the AFC tournament.

Australia U20
On 16 March 2018, Dawber was selected to join the Young Matildas.

Club statistics

References

External links
 Chelsie Dawber AdelaideUnited.com.au
 Chelsie Dawber at Soccerway

2000 births
Living people
Adelaide United FC (A-League Women) players
Women's association football midfielders
Australian women's soccer players
Chicago Red Stars players
National Women's Soccer League players
A-League Women players